Marginodostomia suturamarginata is a species of sea snail, a marine gastropod mollusk in the family Pyramidellidae, the pyrams and their allies.

Description
The length of the shell attains 2.5 mm.

Distribution
This marine species occurs off the Philippines.

References

External links
 To World Register of Marine Species

Pyramidellidae
Gastropods described in 1936
Molluscs described in 1936